Diplurodes is a genus of moths in the family Geometridae.

Species
 Diplurodes decursaria (Walker, 1862)
 Diplurodes indentata Warren, 1897
 Diplurodes inundata Prout, 1929
 Diplurodes kerangatis Holloway, 1993
 Diplurodes petras (Meyrick, 1897)
 Diplurodes semicircularis Holloway, 1993
 Diplurodes sinecoremata Holloway, 1993
 Diplurodes submontana Holloway, 1976
 Diplurodes sugillata Prout, 1932
 Diplurodes triangulata Holloway, 1993
 Diplurodes vestita Warren, 1896

References
 Diplurodes at Markku Savela's Lepidoptera and Some Other Life Forms
 Natural History Museum Lepidoptera genus database

Boarmiini
Geometridae genera